Three Charmed Lives (三生) is a 2014 Hong Kong film directed by Francis Ng, Jung Woo-sung and Chang Chen. The film entered into the 2014 Hong Kong International Film Festival. It was released in theaters on 15 August 2014.

Cast
Shih Chin-Hang, 
Wang Hsin-Yuan, 
Andy Choi, 
Woo Sang-jeon, 
Cheng Taishen, 
Zhang Xinyuan

References

2014 films
Hong Kong drama films
2010s Cantonese-language films
2010s Hong Kong films